The 1936 All-SEC football team consists of American football players selected to the All-Southeastern Conference (SEC) chosen by various selectors for the 1936 college football season. LSU won the conference for the second straight year.

All-SEC selections

Ends
Gaynell Tinsley, LSU (College Football Hall of Fame) (AP-1, UP-1)
Joel Eaves, Auburn (AP-1, UP-2)
Dick Plasman, Vanderbilt (AP-3, UP-1)
Perron Shoemaker, Alabama (AP-2, UP-2)
Otis Maffett, Georgia (AP-2)
Chuck Gelatka, Miss. St. (AP-3)

Tackles
Frank Kinard, Ole Miss (College Football Hall of Fame) (AP-1, UP-1)
Rupert Colmore, Sewanee (AP-1, UP-2)
Bill Moss, Tulane (AP-2, UP-1)
Paul Carroll, LSU (AP-3, UP-2)
Stanley Nevers, Kentucky (AP-2)
Lott, Miss. St. (AP-3)

Guards
Art White, Alabama (AP-1, UP-1)
Frank Gantt, Auburn (AP-3, UP-1)
Wardell Leisk, LSU (AP-1)
Middleton Fitzsimmons, Georgia Tech (AP-2, UP-2)
DeWitt Weaver, Tennessee (AP-2, UP-2)
Elijah Tinsley, Georgia (AP-3)

Centers
Walter Gilbert, Auburn (College Football Hall of Fame) (AP-1, UP-1)
Marvin Stewart, LSU (AP-2, UP-2)
Carl Hinkle, Vanderbilt (College Football Hall of Fame) (AP-3)

Quarterbacks
Joe Riley, Alabama (AP-1, UP-1)
Walter Mayberry, Florida (AP-2)
Bill May, LSU (AP-3)

Halfbacks
Phil Dickens, Tennessee (AP-1, UP-1)
Howard Bryan, Tulane (AP-1, UP-1)
Bill Crass, LSU (AP-3, UP-2)
Robert Davis, Kentucky (AP-3, UP-2)
Joe Kilgrow, Alabama (AP-2)
Ray Hapes, Ole Miss (AP-2)

Fullbacks
Marlon "Dutch" Konemann, Georgia Tech (AP-1, UP-1)
Pat Coffee, LSU (AP-2, UP-2)
Wilton Kilgore, Auburn (AP-3, UP-2)

Key

AP = Associated Press.

UP = United Press.

Bold = Consensus first-team selection by both AP and UP

See also
1936 College Football All-America Team

References

All-SEC
All-SEC football teams